Church of All Saints is a  Grade I listed church in Riseley, Bedfordshire, England. It became a listed building on 13 July 1964.

The tower, roofs and seating are of the 15th century.

See also
Grade I listed buildings in Bedfordshire

References

Church of England church buildings in Bedfordshire
Grade I listed churches in Bedfordshire